The 1942 Irish local elections were held in all the counties, cities and towns of Ireland on 19 August 1942, during The Emergency.

Results

References 

Local elections
1942 elections in Europe
1942